Apsley River, a perennial stream of the Macleay River catchment, is located in the Northern Tablelands district of New South Wales, Australia.

Course and features

Together with the Macleay River, the Apsley River has developed deeply incised river valleys into Ordovician meta-sedimentary rocks including greywacke, slate, phyllite, schist, chert and argillites. This has produced a number of spectacular gorges and waterfalls on or near the Apsley River in the Oxley Wild Rivers National Park.

The Apsley Macleay Gorges are a converging point for moister eastern coastal and dry western floras, and some 950 native plant species have been identified, of which 36 are rare or threatened. The gorge wattle is a rare species that mainly grows in the Apsley-Macleay gorges. Epiphytic orchids may also be observed growing in trees.

The entire length of the Apsley River is within the boundaries of Walcha Shire and Vernon County.

Dingos, brumbies, carpet pythons, goannas and feral pigs inhabit parts of the warmer, lower reaches of the Apsley River.

History 
The traditional custodians of the land surrounding the Apsley River are the Aboriginal people of the Ngayaywana and Dyangadi nations. Archaeological evidence of Aboriginal camp sites have been found on the upper terraces of the Apsley and Macleay Rivers.

In 1818 explorer, John Oxley, camped beside the Apsley River very near the present townsite en route to the coast. A cairn now marks his campsite alongside the Apsley River, which Oxley named after The Lord Apsley, Secretary of State for Colonies. He recorded the event in his diary that day: 
"We halted in a fine and spacious valley ... watered by a fine brook, and at a distance of a mile we saw several fires at which appeared many natives."

Australian red cedar (Toona ciliata) cutters were active in the area's rainforests before 1860. Some red cedar trees may still be seen in the more remote tributaries of the river.

The deep "Mill Hole" in the Apsley River, above the Fitzroy Street bridge, was used as the local swimming hole until the Walcha and District War Memorial Baths were completed in October 1970.

In 1981 the Electricity Commission of New South Wales (Elcom) proposed to build a large pumped storage scheme on the Apsley River to supply electricity for peak energy demand periods. During late 1981 Elcom improved the Cicolini Trail to the Apsley River and installed a river gauging station. The project was shelved following a land use study recommending a major national park be established. In 1986 the park was gazetted to foster nature conservation, cultural heritage and tourism on the Northern Tablelands.

The Lower Apsley River Landcare Group was formed in 1993 to improve the health of the riparian zone of the Apsley River. Since its establishment, the group has planted 320,000 trees across 140 sites, most of which were thriving as at 2008.

In 2007, the old single lane wooden bridge over the Apsley River in Walcha was replaced with the two-lane bridge, with a pedestrian pathway, located on Middle Street.

Flooding
The Apsley River flooded Walcha in 1893, 1935, 1941 and 1952. The maximum period between floods up to 1962 was ten years. Walcha's worst flood was on 12 January 1962, when 40 business houses and 39 residences were flooded. Losses were in the vicinity of A$250,000. A public appeal raised A$11,000 and the Armidale Lord Mayor's fund gave £8,650. It cost the Walcha Shire $2,000 to clean up the town, however the amount of work carried out by volunteers would have doubled this figure.

In September 1967 Walcha Council decided to proceed with flood mitigation, provided it did not exceed $140,000. By September 1971, all required land had been resumed to give the council full control for flood mitigation purposes. The scheme was almost complete by October 1973 and the flood warning system on "Somerset" became redundant. Since the construction of the levee banks there has been no further flooding of the township.

The Apsley River flooded on 28 November 2008, causing major damage to farming properties and livestock losses. The levee banks saved Walcha township from flooding.

See also 

 Apsley Falls
 List of rivers in New South Wales (A-K)

Gallery

References

External links
 

 

Rivers of New South Wales
Northern Tablelands
Mid North Coast